The 2001 Detroit Tigers season was the team's 101st season and its 2nd at Comerica Park.  The Detroit Tigers failed to win the AL Central and finished with a 66–96 record, missing the playoffs for the 14th consecutive season.

Offseason
December 5, 2000: Randall Simon was signed as a free agent with the Detroit Tigers.

Regular season

Season standings

Record vs. opponents

Opening Day lineup

Roger Cedeño, rf

Damion Easley, 2b

Bobby Higginson, lf

Tony Clark, 1b

Billy McMillon, dh

Deivi Cruz, ss

Juan Encarnación, cf

Shane Halter, 3b

Brandon Inge, c

Jeff Weaver, p

Notable transactions
July 28, 2001: Todd Jones was traded by the Detroit Tigers to the Minnesota Twins for Mark Redman.

Roster

Game log

|-align="center" bgcolor="#ffbbbb"
| 1 || April 3 || Twins || 3–2 || Radke (1–0) || Weaver (0–1) ||  Wells (1)  || 2:32 || 40,104 || 0–1 || box
|-align="center" bgcolor="#ffbbbb"
| 2 || April 5 || Twins || 9–5 (10) || Guardado (1–0) || Jones (0–1) || || 3:12 || 20,836 || 0–2 || box
|-align="center" bgcolor="#bbffbb"
| 3 || April 6 || @ White Sox || 10–9 (10) || Patterson (1–0) || Foulke (0–1) || Jones (1) || 3:38 || 43,954 || 1–2 || box
|-align="center" bgcolor="#bbffbb"
| 4 || April 7 || @ White Sox || 5–3 || Holt (1–0) || Buehrle (0–1) || Jones (2) || 2:31 || 20,264 || 2–2 || box
|-align="center" bgcolor="#bbffbb"
| 5 || April 8 || @ White Sox || 5–3 || Weaver (1–1) || Wells (1–1) || Jones (3) || 2:49 || 19,887 || 3–2 || box
|-align="center" bgcolor="#ffbbbb"
| 6 || April 9 || @ Twins || 11–5 || Radke (2–0)|| Sparks (0–1) || || 3:01 || 46,101 || 3–3 || box
|-align="center" bgcolor="#ffbbbb"
| 7 || April 10 || @ Twins || 8–2 || Milton (1–0)|| Perisho (0–1) || || 2:43 || 9,130 || 3–4 || box  
|-align="center" bgcolor="#ffbbbb"
| 8 || April 11 || @ Twins || 12–1 || Mays (2–0)|| Mlicki (0–1) || || 2:47 || 11,149 || 3–5 || box
|-align="center" bgcolor="#ffbbbb"
| 9 || April 12 || Indians || 5–3 || Colón (1–1) || Holt (1–1) || Wickman (3) || 3:15 || 15,639 || 3–6 || box
|-align="center" bgcolor="#ffbbbb"
| 10 || April 13 || Indians || 9–8 || Sabathia (1–0) || Weaver (1–2) || Shuey (1) || 3:27 || 20,334 || 3–7 || box
|-align="center" bgcolor="#bbffbb"
| 11 || April 14 || Indians || 1–0 || Sparks (1–1) || Finley (1–2) || || 2:03 || 23,119 || 4–7 || box
|-align="center" bgcolor="#bbbbbb"
| – || April 15 || Indians ||  colspan=8 |Postponed (rain) Rescheduled for July 28
|-align="center" bgcolor="#bbffbb"
| 12 || April 17 || White Sox || 7–4 || Anderson (1–0) || Wunsch (0–1) || Jones (4) || 2:39 || 13,068 || 5–7 || box
|-align="center" bgcolor="#ffbbbb"
| 13 || April 18 || White Sox || 6–4 || Buehrle (1–2) || Holt (1–2) || Foulke (4) || 2:49 || 13,180 || 5–8 || box
|-align="center" bgcolor="#ffbbbb"
| 14 || April 19 || White Sox || 3–1 || Wells (2–2) || Weaver (1–3) || || 2:34 || 14,571 || 5–9 || box
|-align="center" bgcolor="#ffbbbb"
| 15 || April 20 || @ Indians || 5–4 || Wickman (1–0) || Nitkowski (0–1) || || 3:19 || 33,127 || 5–10 || box
|-align="center" bgcolor="#ffbbbb"
| 16 || April 21 || @ Indians || 5–4 (11) || Reed (1–1) || Jones (0–2) || || 3:27 || 42,068 || 5–11 || box
|-align="center" bgcolor="#ffbbbb"
| 17 || April 22 || @ Indians || 11–3 || Burba (2–1) || Mlicki (0–2) || || 3:02 || 34,125 || 5–12 || box
|-align="center" bgcolor="#ffbbbb"
| 18 || April 24 || Orioles || 8–3 || Hentgen (1–2) || Weaver (1–4) || || 2:41 || 14,101 || 5–13 || box
|-align="center" bgcolor="#ffbbbb"
| 19 || April 25 || Orioles || 6–4 || Roberts (3–0) || Sparks (2–0) || Kohlmeier (4) || 2:48 || 18,919 || 5–14 || box
|-align="center" bgcolor="#bbffbb"
| 20 || April 26 || Orioles || 8–2 || Holt (2–2) || Johnson (1–2) || || 2:37 || 18,824 || 6–14 || box
|-align="center" bgcolor="#bbffbb"
| 21 || April 27 || Devil Rays || 4–2 || Mlicki (1–2) || Rupe (1–3) || Jones (5) || 2:49 || 16,458 || 7–14 || box
|- align="center" bgcolor="#ffbbbb"
| 22 || April 28 || Devil Rays || 7–3 || Judd (1–0) || Perisho (0–2) || || 3:03 || 18,666 || 7–15 || box
|- align="center" bgcolor="#bbffbb"
| 23 || April 29 || Devil Rays || 6–1 || Weaver (2–4) || Lopez (3–2) || || 2:27 || 16,769 || 8–15 || box
|-

|- align="center" bgcolor="#bbffbb"
| 24 || May 1 || @ Rangers || 6–3 (10) || Patterson (2–0) || Zimmerman (1–2) || Jones (6) || 3:01 || 25,638 || 9–15 || box
|- align="center" bgcolor="#bbffbb"
| 25 || May 2 || @ Rangers || 8–4 || Holt (3–2) || Oliver (4–1) || Anderson (1) || 3:00 || 33,825 || 10–15 || box
|- align="center" bgcolor="#bbffbb"
| 26 || May 3 || @ Rangers || 9–4 || Mlicki (2–2) || Helling (1–5) || || 2:48 || 34,051 || 11–15 || box
|- align="center" bgcolor="#ffbbbb"
| 27 || May 4 || @ Angels || 7–5 || Weber (1–0) || Murray (0–1) || Percival (7) || 3:16 || 36,690 || 11–16 || box
|- align="center"  bgcolor="#bbffbb"
| 28 || May 5 || @ Angels || 11–2 || Weaver (3–4) || Ortiz (3–3) || || 2:49 || 24,758 || 12–16 || box
|- align="center" bgcolor="#ffbbbb"
| 29 || May 6 || @ Angels || 3–2 || Levine (1–1) || Patterson (2–1) || || 2:56 || 29,353 || 12–17 || box
|- align="center" bgcolor="#bbffbb"
| 30 || May 8 || Rangers || 5–4 || Jones (1–2) || Crabtree (0–1) || || 3:36 || 21,662 || 13–17 || box
|- align="center" bgcolor="#bbffbb"
| 31 || May 9 || Rangers || 3–2 || Mlicki (3–2) || Davis (2–3) || Jones (7) || 2:55 || 17,933 || 14–17 || box
|- align="center" bgcolor="#bbffbb"
| 32 || May 10 || Rangers || 6–5 || Patterson (3–1) || Zimmerman (1–3) || Jones (8) || 2:56 || 25,306 || 15–17 || box
|- align="center" bgcolor="#bbffbb"
| 33 || May 11 || Angels || 7–6 || Jones (2–2) ||Lukasiewicz (0–1) || || 4:17 || 18,811 || 16–17 || box
|- align="center" bgcolor="#bbffbb"
| 34 || May 12 || Angels || 4–1 || Anderson (2–0) || Hasegawa (1–3) || || 2:53 || 22,133 || 17–17 || box
|- align="center" bgcolor="#ffbbbb"
| 35 || May 13 || Angels || 14–2 || Washburn (2–4) || Holt (3–3) || || 3:16 || 20,012 || 17–18 || box
|- align="center" bgcolor="#ffbbbb"
| 36 || May 15 || @ Orioles || 11–3 || Ponson (1–3) || Mlicki (3–3) || || 3:07 || 33,853 || 17–19 || box
|- align="center" bgcolor="#ffbbbb"
| 37 || May 16 || @ Orioles || 3–2 || Hentgen (2–3) || Weaver (3–5) || Ryan (1) || 2:24 || 27,722 || 17–20 || box
|- align="center" bgcolor="#bbffbb"
| 38 || May 17 || @ Orioles || 7–5 || Sparks (2–2) || Roberts (4–3) || Jones (9) || 2:52 || 27,508 || 18–20 || box
|- align="center" bgcolor="#bbffbb"
| 39 || May 18 || @ Devil Rays || 18–2 || Santos (1–0) || Sturtze (1–3) || || 3:00 || 12,131 || 19–20 || box
|- align="center" bgcolor="#bbffbb"
| 40 || May 19 || @ Devil Rays || 10–5 || Holt (4–3) || Lopez (3–4) || Patterson (1) || 2:59 || 13,304 || 20–20 || box
|- align="center" bgcolor="#ffbbbb"
| 41 || May 20 || @ Devil Rays || 10–2 || Wilson (2–5) || Mlicki (3–4) || || 2:39 || 13,512 || 20–21 || box
|- align="center" bgcolor="#bbffbb"
| 42 || May 22 || @ Indians || 3–0 || Weaver (4–5) || Colón (4–4) || Jones (10) || 3:00 || 35,362 || 21–21 || box
|- align="center" bgcolor="#ffbbbb"
| 43 || May 23 || @ Indians || 4–3 || Wickman (2–0) || Borkowski (0–1) || || 3:11 || 36,804 || 21–22 || box
|- align="center" bgcolor="#ffbbbb"
| 44 || May 24 || @ Indians || 8–5 || Burba (7–2) || Santos (1–1) || Wickman (8) || 3:10 || 36,295 || 21–23 || box
|- align="center" bgcolor="#ffbbbb"
| 45 || May 25 || White Sox || 8–4 || Lowe (2–0) || Jones (2–3) || || 3:08 || 21,053 || 21–24 || box
|- align="center" bgcolor="#ffbbbb"
| 46 || May 26 || White Sox || 8–0 || Buehrle (2–3) || Mlicki (3–5) || || 2:39 || 25,881 || 21–25 || box
|- align="center" bgcolor="#ffbbbb"
| 47 || May 27 || White Sox || 3–2 || Barceló (1–0) || Patterson (3–2) || Lowe (1) || 3:55 || 17,355 || 21–26 || box
|- align="center" bgcolor="#bbffbb"
| 48 || May 28 || Indians || 12–6 || Sparks (3–2) || Finley (4–4) || || 2:56 || 24,615 || 22–26 || box
|- align="center" bgcolor="#ffbbbb"
| 49 || May 29 || Indians || 6–4 || Shuey (4–1)  || Murray (0–2) || Wickman (10) || 3:20 || 21,404 || 22–27 || box
|- align="center" bgcolor="#ffbbbb"
| 50 || May 30 || Indians || 8–4 || Wright (1–0)  || Holt (4–4) || Wickman (11) || 3:31 || 18,359 || 22–28 || box
|-align="center" bgcolor="#bbbbbb"
| – || May 31 || @ White Sox || colspan=8 |Postponed (rain) Rescheduled for September 4
|-

|-align="center" bgcolor="#ffbbbb"
| 51 || June 1 || @ White Sox || 3–0 || Buehrle (3–3) || Mlicki (3–6) || Foulke (10) || 2:34 || 19,840 || 22–29 || box
|-align="center" bgcolor="#ffbbbb"
| 52 || June 2 || @ White Sox || 5–3 || Wells (4–5) || Weaver (4–6) || Foulke (11) || 2:30 || 23,915 || 22–30 || box
|-align="center" bgcolor="#ffbbbb"
| 53 || June 3 || @ White Sox || 9–6 (10) || Howry (3–2) || Jones (2–4) || || 3:17 || 19,446 || 22–31 || box
|-align="center" bgcolor="#ffbbbb"
| 54 || June 5 || @ Red Sox || 4–3 (18) || Wakefield (3–0) || Borkowski (0–2) || || 5:52 || 32,814 || 22–32 || box
|-align="center" bgcolor="#bbffbb"
| 55 || June 6 || @ Red Sox || 7–3 || Mlicki (4–6) || Castillo (5–4) || Anderson (2) || 3:14 || 32,794 || 23–32 || box
|-align="center" bgcolor="#ffbbbb"
| 56 || June 7 || @ Red Sox || 8–1 || Wakefield (4–0) || Santos (1–2)|| Arrojo (5) || 2:59 || 32,132 || 23–33 || box
|-align="center" bgcolor="#bbffbb"
| 57 || June 8 || Brewers || 9–4 || Weaver (5–6) || Rigdon (3–4) || || 3:23 || 27,770 || 24–33 || box
|-align="center" bgcolor="#bbffbb"
| 58 || June 9 || Brewers || 6–5 || Anderson (3–0) || Leskanic (2–3) || || 2:52 || 26,276 || 25–33 || box
|-align="center" bgcolor="#ffbbbb"
| 59 || June 10 || Brewers || 8–3 || Wright (5–4) ||  Holt (4–5) || || 2:51 || 23,070 || 25–34 || box
|-align="center" bgcolor="#ffbbbb"
| 60 || June 12 || Pirates || 13–3 || Ritchie (1–8)|| Mlicki (4–7) || || 2:41 || 15,919 || 25–35 || box
|-align="center" bgcolor="#bbffbb"
| 61 || June 13 || Pirates || 6–3 || Weaver (6–6) || Beimel (2–2)|| Anderson (3) || 3:04 || 17,639 || 26–35 || box
|-align="center" bgcolor="#bbffbb"
| 62 || June 14 || Pirates || 6–4 || Sparks (4–2) || Arroyo (3–5) || Anderson (4) || 2:45 || 17,305 || 27–35 || box
|-align="center" bgcolor="#bbffbb"
| 63 || June 15 || @ Diamondbacks || 5–2 || Holt (5–5) || Brohawn (1–3) || Anderson (5) || 2:59 || 31,683 || 28–35 || box
|-align="center" bgcolor="#ffbbbb"
| 64 || June 16 || @ Diamondbacks || 3–1 || Ellis (6–2) || Blair (0–1) || Prinz (6) || 2:44 || 35,028 || 28–36 || box
|-align="center" bgcolor="#ffbbbb"
| 65 || June 17 || @ Diamondbacks || 8–3 || Schilling (11–2) || Mlicki (4–8) || || 2:34 || 39,760 || 28–37 || box
|-align="center" bgcolor="#ffbbbb"
| 66 || June 18 || Yankees || 10–1 || Clemens (9–1) ||  Weaver (6–7) || || 3:03 || 29,365 || 28–38 || box
|-align="center" bgcolor="#bbffbb"
| 67 || June 19 || Yankees || 7–1 || Sparks (5–2) || Keisler (1–2) || || 2:20 || 24,171 || 29–38 || box
|-align="center" bgcolor="#bbffbb"
| 68 || June 20 || Yankees || 5–2 || Holt (6–5) || Hernández (0–1) || Anderson (6) || 3:18 || 23,618 || 30–38 || box
|-align="center" bgcolor="#bbbbbb"
| – || June 21 || Yankees || colspan=8 |Postponed (rain) Rescheduled for July 18
|-align="center" bgcolor="#bbffbb"
| 69 || June 22 || Twins || 5–4 || Jones (3–4) || Wells (5–3) || || 3:01 || 28,282 || 31–38 || box
|-align="center" bgcolor="#bbffbb"
| 70 || June 23 || Twins || 10–9 || Patterson (4–2) || Carrasco (3–3) || Jones (11) || 3:18 || 28,935 || 32–38 || box
|-align="center" bgcolor="#ffbbbb"
| 71 || June 24 || Twins || 14–5 || Milton (8–3) || Sparks (5–3) || || 3:04 || 27,024 || 32–39 || box
|-align="center" bgcolor="#ffbbbb"
| 72 || June 25 || Twins || 6–3 || Mays (9–5) || Holt (6–6) || Hawkins (17) || 2:43 || 22,302 || 32–40 || box
|-align="center" bgcolor="#ffbbbb"
| 73 || June 26 || @ Royals || 12–5 || Reichert (7–6) || Blair (0–2) || || 2:39 || 13,966 || 32–41 || box
|-align="center" bgcolor="#ffbbbb"
| 74 || June 27 || @ Royals || 5–4 || Hernández (2–2) || Jones (3–5) || || 2:50 || 15,207 || 32–42 || box
|-align="center" bgcolor="#ffbbbb"
| 75 || June 28 || @ Royals || 9–2 || Durbin (6–6) || Weaver (6–8) || || 2:39 || 22,239 || 32–43 || box
|-align="center" bgcolor="#ffbbbb"
| 76 || June 29 || @ Twins || 3–2 || Wells (6–3) || Murray (0–3) || Hawkins (19) || 2:41 || 21,312 || 32–44 || box
|-align="center" bgcolor="#ffbbbb"
| 77 || June 30 || @ Twins || 3–2 || Mays (10–5) || Holt (6–6) || Guardado (3) || 2:12 || 34,460 || 32–45 || box
|-

|-align="center" bgcolor="#ffbbbb"
| 78 || July 1 || @ Twins || 8–3 || Santana (1–0) || Blair (0–3) || || 2:41 || 21,031 || 32–46 || box
|-align="center" bgcolor="#bbffbb"
| 79 || July 3 || Royals || 8–4 || Lima (2–2) || Durbin (6–7) || || 2:55 || 23,824 || 33–46 || box
|-align="center" bgcolor="#bbffbb"
| 80 || July 4 || Royals || 6–4 || Weaver (7–8) || Bailey (1–1) || Anderson (7) || 3:22 || 27,115 || 34–46 || box
|-align="center" bgcolor="#bbffbb"
| 81 || July 5 || Royals || 7–1 || Sparks (6–3) || Wilson (2–1) || || 2:20 || 22,281 || 35–46 || box
|-align="center" bgcolor="#ffbbbb"
| 82 || July 6 || Cubs || 15–9 || Heredia (2–0) || Nitkowski (0–2) || || 3:49 || 39,906 || 35–47 || box
|-align="center" bgcolor="#ffbbbb"
| 83 || July 7 || Cubs || 10–6 || Lieber (11–4) || Blair (0–4) || || 3:09 || 39,697 || 35–48 || box
|-align="center" bgcolor="#bbffbb"
| 84 || July 8 || Cubs || 9–6 || Jones (4–5) || Heredia (2–1) || Anderson (8) || 2:59 || 38,729 || 36–48 || box
|- align="center" bgcolor="#bbffbb"
| 85 || July 12 || @ Cardinals || 7–5 || Weaver (8–8) || Kile (9–7) || Anderson (9) || 3:14 || 35,554 || 37–48 || box
|- align="center" bgcolor="#bbffbb"
| 86 || July 13 || @ Cardinals || 4–1 || Sparks (7–3) || Matthews (3–4) || || 2:32 || 38,667 || 38–48 || box
|- align="center" bgcolor="#ffbbbb"
| 87 || July 14 || @ Cardinals || 3–2 || Morris (11–5) || Lima (2–3) || Kline (3) || 2:36 || 47,176 || 38–49 || box
|- align="center" bgcolor="#bbffbb"
| 88 || July 15 || @ Reds || 8–5 || Blair (1–4) ||  Nichting (0–3) || Anderson (10) || 3:07 || 24,719 || 39–49 || box
|- align="center" bgcolor="#ffbbbb"
| 89 || July 16 || @ Reds || 9–1 || Davis (2–1) || Pettyjohn (0–1) || || 2:28 || 19,757 || 39–50 || box
|- align="center" bgcolor="#bbffbb"
| 90 || July 17 || @ Reds || 3–1 || Weaver (9–8) || Reitsma (4–9) || Anderson (11) || 2:58 || 19,933 || 40–50 || box
|- align="center" bgcolor="#ffbbbb"
| 91 || July 18 || Yankees || 8–5 || Clemens (13–1) || Sparks (7–4) || Rivera (32) || 2:49 || 14,800 || 40–51 || box
|- align="center" bgcolor="#bbffbb"
| 92 || July 18 || Yankees || 12–4 || Santos (2–2) || Lilly (3–3) || || 3:11 || 33,216 || 41–51 || box
|- align="center" bgcolor="#bbffbb"
| 93 || July 19 || Yankees || 11–2 || Lima (3–3) || Pettitte (9–6) || || 2:38 || 35,320 || 42–51 || box
|- align="center" bgcolor="#bbffbb"
| 94 || July 20 || @ Indians || 7–3 || Holt (7–7) || Westbrook (2–2) || || 3:03 || 42,520 || 43–51 || box
|- align="center" bgcolor="#ffbbbb"
| 95 || July 21 || @ Indians || 8–4 || Nagy (4–3) || Pettyjohn (0–2) || || 2:31 || 42,316 || 43–52 || box
|- align="center" bgcolor="#ffbbbb"
| 96 || July 22 || @ Indians || 6–3 || Colón (9–7) || Weaver (9–9) || || 3:07 || 42,462 || 43–53 || box
|- align="center" bgcolor="#ffbbbb"
| 97 || July 24 || @ Yankees || 5–3 || Pettitte (10–6) || Sparks (7–5) || Rivera (33) || 2:58 || 34,519 || 43–54 || box
|- align="center" bgcolor="#ffbbbb"
| 98 || July 25 || @ Yankees || 4–2 || Witasick (7–2) || Lima (3–4) || Rivera (34) || 2:40 || 34,480 || 43–55 || box
|- align="center" bgcolor="#ffbbbb"
| 99 || July 26 || @ Yankees || 14–8 || Mendoza (7–2) || Holt (7–8) || || 3:13 || 45,221 || 43–56 || box
|- align="center" bgcolor="#ffbbbb"
| 100 || July 27 || Indians || 7–4 || Colón (10–7) || Pettyjohn (0–3) || Wickman (18) || 2:57 || 39,504 || 43–57 || box
|- align="center" bgcolor="#ffbbbb"
| 101 || July 28 || Indians || 6–4 || Báez (1–0) || Murray (0–4) || Wickman (19) || 3:09 || 27,643 || 43–58 || box
|- align="center" bgcolor="#bbffbb"
| 102 || July 28 || Indians || 4–2 || Weaver (10–9) || Woodard (1–1) || Anderson (12) || 2:44 || 34,916 || 44–58 || box 
|- align="center" bgcolor="#bbffbb"
| 103 || July 29 || Indians || 8–3 || Sparks (8–5) || Burba (9–8) || || 2:38 || 32,918 || 45–58 || box
|- align="center" bgcolor="#bbffbb"
| 104 || July 31 || Mariners || 4–2 || Lima (4–4) || Sele (12–3) || Anderson (13) || 2:24 || 30,022 || 46–58 || box
|-

|- align="center" bgcolor="#ffbbbb"
| 105 || August 1 || Mariners || 7–1 || Abbott (11–2) || Holt (7–9) || || 3:01 || 23,847 || 46–59 || box
|- align="center" bgcolor="#ffbbbb"
| 106 || August 2 || Mariners || 2–1 || Piñeiro (2–0) || Pettyjohn (0–4) || Sasaki (35) || 2:23 || 27,097 || 46–60 || box
|- align="center" bgcolor="#ffbbbb"
| 107 || August 3 || Athletics || 2–1 || Hudson (13–6) || Weaver (10–10) || || 2:25 || 30,071 || 46–61 || box
|- align="center" bgcolor="#ffbbbb"
| 108 || August 4 || Athletics || 10–1 || Zito (7–7) || Sparks (8–6) || || 2:29 || 28,331 || 46–62 || box
|- align="center" bgcolor="#ffbbbb"
| 109 || August 5 || Athletics || 4–1 || Lidle (6–5) || Lima (4–5) || Isringhausen (20) || 2:18 || 26,626 || 46–63 || box
|- align="center" bgcolor="#ffbbbb"
| 110 || August 6 || Athletics || 6–3 || Vizcaíno (1–0) || Patterson (4–3) || Isringhausen (21) || 3:06 || 21,830 || 46–64 || box
|- align="center" bgcolor="#bbffbb"
| 111 || August 7 || @ Rangers || 7–3 || Perisho (1–2) || Venafro (4–3) || || 2:44 || 26,621 || 47–64 || box
|- align="center" bgcolor="#bbffbb"
| 112 || August 8 || @ Rangers || 19–6 || Patterson (5–3) || Venafro (4–4) || || 3:26 || 30,016 || 48–64 || box
|- align="center" bgcolor="#ffbbbb"
| 113 || August 9 || @ Rangers || 7–3 || Helling (9–9) || Sparks (8–7) || || 3:08 || 27,652 || 48–65 || box
|- align="center" bgcolor="#ffbbbb"
| 114 || August 10 || @ Royals || 7–3 || Byrd (5–5) || Weaver (10–11) || Stein (1) || 2:38 || 22,107 || 48–66 || box
|- align="center" bgcolor="#ffbbbb" 
| 115 || August 11 || @ Royals || 4–1 || George (1–3) || Lima (4–6) || Hernández (21) || 2:04 || 26,943 || 48–67 || box
|- align="center" bgcolor="#ffbbbb"
| 116 || August 12 || @ Royals || 6–4 || Suppan (6–10) || Pettyjohn (0–5) || Hernández (22) || 2:31 || 17,811 || 48–68 || box
|- align="center" bgcolor="#ffbbbb"
| 117 || August 14 || Angels || 7–1 || Washburn (10–6) || Cornejo (0–1) || || 2:52 || 24,082 || 48–69 || box
|- align="center" bgcolor="#bbffbb"
| 118 || August 15 || Angels || 5–1 || Perisho (2–2) || Holtz (0–1) || || 2:33 || 20,853 || 49–69 || box
|- align="center" bgcolor="#ffbbbb"
| 119 || August 16 || Angels || 4–2 || Schoeneweis (10–8) || Weaver (10–12) || Percival (34) || 2:37 || 22,141 || 49–70 || box
|- align="center" bgcolor="#bbffbb"
| 120 || August 17 || Royals || 4–2 || Lima (5–6) || George (1–4) || Anderson (14) || 2:12 || 30,214 || 50–70 || box
|- align="center" bgcolor="#ffbbbb"
| 121 || August 18 || Royals || 8–4 || Suppan (7–10) || Nitkowski (0–3) || || 2:50 || 31,897 || 50–71 || box
|- align="center" bgcolor="#bbffbb"
| 122 || August 19 || Royals || 4–3 || Cornejo (1–1) || Durbin (7–12) || Anderson (15) || 2:17 ||  26,898 || 51–71 || box
|- align="center" bgcolor="#bbffbb"
| 123 || August 20 || @ Mariners || 4–1 || Sparks (9–7) || García (15–5) || || 2:22 || 45,972 || 52–71 || box
|- align="center" bgcolor="#ffbbbb"
| 124 || August 21 || @ Mariners || 4–1 || Sele (13–4) || Weaver (10–13) || Sasaki (40) || 2:20 || 45,036 || 52–72 || box
|- align="center" bgcolor="#ffbbbb"
| 125 || August 22 || @ Mariners || 16–1 || Abbott (13–3) || Lima (5–7) || || 2:57 || 45,814 || 52–73 || box
|- align="center" bgcolor="#ffbbbb"
| 126 || August 23 || @ Mariners || 5–1 || Piñeiro (3–0) || Redman (2–5) || || 3:10 || 45,063 || 52–74 || box
|- align="center" bgcolor="#bbffbb"
| 127 || August 24 || @ Athletics || 8–4 || Cornejo (2–1) || Hudson (14–7) || || 3:20 || 41,646 || 53–74 || box
|- align="center" bgcolor="#ffbbbb"
| 128 || August 25 || @ Athletics || 6–1 || Zito (10–8) || Sparks (9–8) || || 2:45 || 24,236 || 53–75 || box
|- align="center" bgcolor="#ffbbbb"
| 129 || August 26 || @ Athletics || 7–6 || Tam (2–3) || Perisho (2–3) || Isringhausen (26) || 3:13 || 27,915 || 53–76 || box
|- align="center" bgcolor="#ffbbbb"
| 130 || August 28 || White Sox || 8–6 || Embree (1–3) || Patterson (5–4) || Howry (5) || 2:59 || 19,129 || 53–77 || box
|- align="center" bgcolor="#ffbbbb"
| 131 || August 29 || White Sox || 8–3 || Glover (4–1) || Redman (2–6) || || 3:19 || 21,998 || 53–78 || box
|- align="center" bgcolor="#bbffbb"
| 132 || August 30 || White Sox || 3–1 || Cornejo (3–1) || Buehrle (12–7) || Anderson (16) || 2:04 || 24,364 || 54–78 || box
|- align="center" bgcolor="#bbffbb"
| 133 || August 31 || @ Blue Jays || 4–3 || Sparks (10–8) || Borbón (2–4) || Anderson (17) || 2:49 || 22,383 || 55–78 || box
|-

|- align="center" bgcolor="#ffbbbb"
| 134 || September 1 || @ Blue Jays || 3–1 || Lyon (4–2) || Weaver (10–14) || Plesac (1) || 2:13 ||  22,052 || 55–79 || box
|- align="center" bgcolor="#ffbbbb"
| 135 || September 2 || @ Blue Jays || 11–0 || Loaiza (10–11) || Lima (5–8) || || 2:39 || 24,146 || 55–80 || box
|- align="center" bgcolor="#ffbbbb"
| 136 || September 4 || @ White Sox || 10–1 || Buehrle (13–7) || Cornejo (3–2) || || 2:41 || N/A || 55–81 || box
|- align="center" bgcolor="#ffbbbb"
| 137 || September 4 || @ White Sox || 4–0 || Lowe (7–4) || Pettyjohn (0–6) || || 2:31 || 13,265 || 55–82 || box
|- align="center" bgcolor="#ffbbbb"
| 138 || September 5 || @ White Sox || 5–3 || Wright (3–2) || Sparks (10–9) || Foulke (37) || 2:45 || 14,576 || 55–83 || box
|- align="center" bgcolor="#bbffbb"
| 139 || September 6 || @ White Sox || 6–2 || Weaver (11–14) || Garland (6–6) || || 3:27 || 13,602 || 56–83 || box
|- align="center" bgcolor="#ffbbbb"
| 140 || September 7 || Blue Jays || 2–1 || Lyon (5–2) || Lima (5–9) || Koch (31) || 2:20 || 28,083 || 56–84 || box
|- align="center" bgcolor="#bbffbb"
| 141 || September 8 || Blue Jays || 4–3 || Murray (1–4) || Halladay (3–2) || Anderson (18) || 2:45 || 29,158 || 57–84 || box
|- align="center" bgcolor="#ffbbbb"
| 142 || September 9 || Blue Jays || 6–3 || Carpenter (10–11) || Cornejo (3–3) || Guardado (6) || 2:56 || 24,652 || 57–85 || box
|- align="center" bgcolor="#ffbbbb"
| 143 || September 10 || Twins || 3–2 || Mays (15–13) || Pineda (0–1) || || 2:48 || 19,456 || 57–86 || box
|-align="center" bgcolor="#bbbbbb"
| – || September 11 || Twins || colspan=8 | Postponed (9/11 attack) Rescheduled for October 2
|-align="center" bgcolor="#bbbbbb"
| – || September 12 || Twins || colspan=8 | Postponed (9/11 attack) Rescheduled for October 3
|-align="center" bgcolor="#bbbbbb"
| – || September 13 || Twins || colspan=8 | Postponed (9/11 attack) Rescheduled for October 4
|-align="center" bgcolor="#bbbbbb"
| – || September 14 || Royals || colspan=8 | Postponed (9/11 attack) Rescheduled for October 5
|-align="center" bgcolor="#bbbbbb"
| – || September 15 || Royals || colspan=8 | Postponed (9/11 attack) Rescheduled for October 6
|-align="center" bgcolor="#bbbbbb"
| – || September 16 || Royals || colspan=8 | Postponed (9/11 attack) Rescheduled for October 7
|- align="center" bgcolor="#ffbbbb"
| 144 || September 18 || @ Twins || 8–3 || Radke (13–9) || Weaver (11–15) || || 2:48 || 10,878 || 57–87 || box
|- align="center" bgcolor="#bbffbb"
| 145 || September 19 || @ Twins || 6–2 || Sparks (11–9) || Milton (14–6) || || 2:28 || 10,157 || 58–87 || box
|- align="center" bgcolor="#ffbbbb"
| 146 || September 20 || @ Twins || 3–0 || Mays (16–13) || Lima (5–10) || || 2:07 || 9,754 || 58–88 || box
|- align="center" bgcolor="#ffbbbb"
| 147 || September 21 || @ Red Sox || 5–2 || Fossum (2–1) || Murray (1–5) || Urbina (21) || 2:33 || 30,905 || 58–89 || box
|- align="center" bgcolor="#bbffbb"
| 148 || September 22 || @ Red Sox || 4–3 || Pettyjohn (1–6) || Arrojo (5–4) || Anderson (19) || 3:05 || 30,871 || 59–89 || box
|- align="center" bgcolor="#bbffbb"
| 149 || September 23 || @ Red Sox || 12–6 || Weaver (12–15) || Nomo (12–9) || || 3:04 || 31,333 || 60–89 || box
|- align="center" bgcolor="#bbffbb"
| 150 || September 24 || @ Royals || 4–2 || Sparks (12–9) || Suppan (9–13) || Anderson (20) || 2:34 || 12,152 || 61–89 || box
|- align="center" bgcolor="#bbffbb"
| 151 || September 25 || @ Royals || 6–4 || Lima (6–10) || George (4–6) || Anderson (21) || 2:47 || 11,160 || 62–89 || box
|- align="center" bgcolor="#ffbbbb"
| 152 || September 26 || @ Royals || 8–6 || Stein (6–8) || Murray (1–6) || Hernández (25) || 3:05 || 11,097 || 62–90 || box
|- align="center" bgcolor="#ffbbbb"
| 153 || September 27 || @ Royals || 8–7 || MacDougal (1–0) || Cornejo (3–4) || Hernández (26) || 3:35 || 11,978 || 62–91 || box
|- align="center" bgcolor="#bbffbb"
| 154 || September 28 || Red Sox || 4–1 || Weaver (13–15) || Nomo (12–10) || Anderson (22) || 2:54 || 32,453 || 63–91 || box
|- align="center" bgcolor="#bbffbb"
| 155 || September 29 || Red Sox || 7–2 || Sparks (13–9) || Kim (0–2) || || 2:25 || 30,089 || 64–91 || box
|- align="center" bgcolor="#ffbbbb"
| 156 || September 30 || Red Sox || 8–5 || Castillo (9–9) || Lima (6–11) || Urbina (23) || 3:15 || 29,229 || 64–92 || box
|-

|- align="center" bgcolor="#ffbbbb"
| 157 || October 2 || Twins || 5–0 || Radke (14–11) || Murray (1–7) || || 2:20 || 11,941 || 64–93 || box
|- align="center" bgcolor="#bbffbb"
| 158 || October 3 || Twins || 9–5 || Cornejo (4–4) || Fiore (0–1) || || 2:39 || 12,318 || 65–93 || box
|- align="center" bgcolor="#ffbbbb"
| 159 || October 4 || Twins || 5–4 || Carrasco (4–3) || Anderson (3–1) || Guardado (10) || 2:44 ||  15,454 || 65–94 || box
|-align="center" bgcolor="#bbbbbb"
| – || October 5 || Royals || colspan=8 |Postponed (rain) Rescheduled for October 6
|- align="center" bgcolor="#ffbbbb"
| 160 || October 6 || Royals || 8–3 || Suppan (10–14) || Weaver (13–16) || Hernández (28) || 2:50 || N/A || 65–95 || box
|- align="center" bgcolor="#bbffbb"
| 161 || October 6 || Royals || 2–1 || Sparks (14–9) || George (4–8) || || 1:56 || 18,884 || 66–95 || box
|- align="center" bgcolor="#ffbbbb"
| 162 || October 7 || Royals || 10–4 || Stein (7–8) || Lima (6–12) || || 2:14 || 19,261 || 66–96 || box
|-

Player stats

Batting
Note: G = Games played; AB = At bats; H = Hits; Avg. = Batting average; HR = Home runs; RBI = Runs batted in

Note: pitchers' batting statistics not included

Pitching

Starting pitchers 
Note: G = Games pitched; IP = Innings pitched; W = Wins; L = Losses; ERA = Earned run average; SO = Strikeouts

Other pitchers 
Note: G = Games pitched; IP = Innings pitched; W = Wins; L = Losses; ERA = Earned run average; SO = Strikeouts

Relief pitchers 
Note: G = Games pitched; W = Wins; L = Losses; SV = Saves; ERA = Earned run average; SO =Strikeouts

Farm system

References

External links

2001 Detroit Tigers First Half Season Schedule/Results
2001 Detroit Tigers Second Half Season Schedule/Results
2001 Detroit Tigers season at Baseball Reference

Detroit Tigers seasons
Detroit Tigers
Detroit Tigers
2001 in Detroit